This is a list of notable websites which provide access to educational films as one of their primary functions.

See also
 List of online video platforms
 List of academic databases and search engines
 List of online databases
 List of online encyclopedias

References

Educational websites
Educational video